Sergei Chuev (born 1971 in Moscow) is a Russian historian specializing in World War II.

Biography 
In 1996 he graduated from the Moscow State Institute of Culture in the specialty "Bibliography and Library Science", in 2001 - University of the Russian Academy of Education (:ru:Университет Российского инновационного образования) majoring in "Civil Law. Jurisprudence". From 1993 to 2003 he served in the Federal Customs Service of Russia. Major of the Customs Service (retired).
Author of six books (co-author of two of them) including Special forces of the Third Reich in two volumes, devoted to activities of the German Abwehr intelligence against the Soviet Union. Second volume describes history of the Reich Security Main Office (RSHA) in German-occupied territories including system of camps and the training of collaborationist Russian Liberation Army. The book details the recruitment from among the Soviet citizens, and the formation of parallel Kaminski Brigade, as well as the SS Division Galicia, Belarusian Home Defence, the Turkestan Legion, and pro-Nazi sabotage units as well as police.

In his book published in 2006, titled , Chuev described the work of Ukrainian nationalists against the Russian Empire. The first evidence of the genocide of the Russian people in Galicia and the planned destruction of all Russian in Western Ukraine in the first decades of the 20th century are presented. 
A special place in the book is given to the history of Ukrainian collaboration with Nazi Germany including war crimes committed by the Ukrainian nationalists against the Russians in Western Ukraine. Special focus was given to the Ukrainian Insurgent Army (UPA) along with the 14th Waffen Grenadier Division of the SS (1st Galician) and the Ukrainian National Army active in the Soviet Union. Chuyev relied on documents stored in the KGB archives including German administration correspondence, testimonies of participants, and rare photography.

Books by Sergei Chuev

Journals

Selected periodicals

Notes and references

 Worldcat.org:  OCLC. Books by Sergei Chuyev.

21st-century Russian historians
1971 births
Living people